Okrent is a surname, and may refer to:
 Arika Okrent, American linguist
 Daniel Okrent (born 1948), American writer and editor
 Detlef Okrent (1909–1983), German field hockey player

See also
 
 Ockrent

Polish-language surnames